Wheeling Island Stadium is a stadium used mostly for American football and soccer located on Wheeling Island in Wheeling, West Virginia. The original portion of the stadium was dedicated on June 10, 1927, but a large concrete seating section was added in 1987. The stadium seats 12,220 in two stands along either sidelines, the end zones are empty. Wheeling Island Stadium usually hosts high school football and soccer events but can host concerts, hosting REO Speedwagon most recently in 2009. President John F. Kennedy delivered a speech at the stadium on September 27, 1962.
 

The stadium is owned and operated by Wheeling Park High School.  

The stadium is also the home of the "Super Six." Each year Wheeling Island plays host to the West Virginia State Football Championships for Class A, AA, AAA. 

The stadium is considered one of the best high school stadiums in WV, mainly due to capacity and layout of the facility. The Wheeling Island Casino Resort is located within walking distance, providing overnight accommodations for teams. There is plenty of parking adjacent to the stadium, and a private lot adjacent to the south end zone for school personnel, media, and pass holders. The stadium is complete with a 3 level press box with camera deck and private boxes for the coaches. In 2008, a video system was installed at the stadium, several corporate sponsors donated to the project including Wheeling Hospital. Students from Wheeling Park High School's TV station, WPHP-TV, operate the cameras for all Wheeling Park football and soccer games. 

In 2004, the previous grass surface was replaced with a ProGrass Turf surface. Due to the stadium's location in a high risk flood zone, there is an emergency plan to seal the playing surface in the event of flooding.

References

High school football venues in the United States
Soccer venues in West Virginia
Buildings and structures in Wheeling, West Virginia
Tourist attractions in Ohio County, West Virginia
1987 establishments in West Virginia
Sports venues completed in 1987
American football venues in West Virginia